The Centre de linguistique appliquée de Dakar (French for "Center of Applied Linguistics of Dakar"), abbreviated CLAD, is a language institute, which especially plays an important role in the orthographical standardization of the Wolof language.

The institute is located in Dakar (Senegal) and belongs to the Cheikh Anta Diop University (French : "Université Cheikh Anta Diop").

History
The Centre was founded in 1963, and was initially headed by Gabriel Manessy.

Overview
The Serer Division is headed by Professor Souleymane Faye. Together with his team, they work towards standardizing the Serer language. Faye, a professor of linguistics at the Cheikh Anta Diop University who has authored and co-authored several books and papers pertaining to the Serer and Cangin languages is one of the current professors of the Centre (as of 2012).

References

External links
CLAD at the Swiss OSIL Site (in French)
Cheikh Anta Diop University (Dakar, Senegal) (in French)

Linguistic research institutes
Educational organisations based in Senegal
Cheikh Anta Diop University
Wolof language